Eugene P. Spellman (September 16, 1930 – May 4, 1991) was a United States district judge of the United States District Court for the Southern District of Florida.

Education and career

Born in New York City, New York, Spellman received a Bachelor of Arts degree from the University of Florida in 1953. He received a Bachelor of Laws from the Fredric G. Levin College of Law at the University of Florida in 1955. He was in private practice of law in Florida from 1956 to 1957. He was a research assistant to the Chief Judge of the Third District Court of Appeals of the State of Florida from 1957 to 1958. He was an assistant attorney general of the Criminal Appeals Division in Tallahassee, Florida from 1958 to 1959. He was an assistant state attorney of Dade County (now Miami-Dade County), Florida from 1959 to 1961. He was in private practice of law in Florida from 1961 to 1979.

Federal judicial service

Spellman was nominated by President Jimmy Carter on July 21, 1979, to the United States District Court for the Southern District of Florida, to a new seat created by 92 Stat. 1629. He was confirmed by the United States Senate on October 4, 1979, and received his commission on October 5, 1979. His service was terminated on May 4, 1991, due to his death of cancer at Mercy Hospital in Miami, Florida. He left the bench only one week before his death.

References

Sources
 

1930 births
1991 deaths
Judges of the United States District Court for the Southern District of Florida
Lawyers from New York City
United States district court judges appointed by Jimmy Carter
20th-century American judges
University of Florida alumni
Fredric G. Levin College of Law alumni
20th-century American lawyers